Brian Geoffrey Green (5 June 1935 – 14 August 2012) is an English former football coach and player. As a player, he competed in the Football League as a forward in the 1950s and 1960s for Rochdale, Southport, Barrow, Exeter City and Chesterfield.

Green was later coach of the Australian national football team in 1975 and 1976. Green coached in Norway with Bryne from 1980 to 1982, and with Start in 1986–87. He later also managed Egersunds in division four in two seasons, 1989 and 1991.

He also had a spell as a coach in Leeds United. Green's coaching career also included a successful stint at Chester, with the club reaching the semi-finals of the Football League Cup and winning promotion from the Football League Fourth Division in 1974-75 when he worked alongside manager Ken Roberts.

References

1935 births
2012 deaths
People from Droylsden
English footballers
Altrincham F.C. players
Chesterfield F.C. players
Exeter City F.C. players
Rochdale A.F.C. players
Southport F.C. players
Colwyn Bay F.C. players
Barrow A.F.C. players
Mossley A.F.C. players
English football managers
Australia national soccer team managers
Bryne FK managers
IK Start managers
British expatriate sportspeople in Norway
Expatriate football managers in Norway
Leeds United F.C. non-playing staff
Association football forwards
Sydney FC Prague players